Kindertransport – The Arrival is an outdoor bronze memorial sculpture by Frank Meisler, located in the forecourt of Liverpool Street station in London, United Kingdom. 
It commemorates the 10,000Jewish children who escaped Nazi persecution and arrived at the station during 1938–1939, whose parents were forced to take the decision to send them to safety in the UK.   Most of the children never saw their parents again, as their parents were subsequently killed in concentration camp, although some were reunited 
 
The memorial was installed in September 2006, replacing Flor Kent's bronze  (For the Child), which was installed in 2003. It was commissioned by World Jewish Relief and the Association of Jewish Refugees (AJR).

Literature
 Marie-Catherine Allard (27 April 2020). Modelling bridges between past and current issues of forced migration: Frank Meisler’s memorial sculpture Kindertransport – The Arrival. In: Jewish historical studies, vol. 51 issue 1, p. 86-104.

See also
 2006 in art
 List of public art in the City of London
 Trains to Life – Trains to Death, Berlin
 Kindertransport – Channel Crossing to Life, Hoek van Holland

References

External links
 Saving Children from the Holocaust: The Kindertransport (pg. 112) by Ann Byers (2011)

2006 establishments in the United Kingdom
2006 sculptures
Bronze sculptures in the United Kingdom
Kindertransport
Monuments and memorials in London
Outdoor sculptures in London
Statues in London
Sculptures of children in the United Kingdom